The 1943 Auckland Rugby League season was its 35th. The season was affected once more by World War II with many men away at war. The Auckland Rugby League decided however that there were enough players at the respective senior clubs to have a 9 team competition with no need for any merged sides. This was made easier by the fact that there was no reserve grade competition.

Manukau had an historic season winning all 4 major trophies. They won the Fox Memorial Shield for the third time following its first title in 1936, and second the previous season in 1942. They finished with a 14 win, 2 loss record, and were 4 points ahead of City Rovers. Manukau also won the Rukutai Shield for winning the first round with a 7 win, 1 loss record. The Roope Rooster was won by with a 21–9 win over Ponsonby United, and then a week later they defeated City Rovers 12-9 for the Stormont Shield which was their 3rd consecutive win of this trophy. On October 16 Manukau played the West Coast champions, Blackball. They were regarded as one of the strongest club sides ever seen in the South Island and had easily defeated the Christchurch champions Sydenham, and the Wellington champions, Petone. Manukau trailed in the second half before a strong finish saw them run out 23-9 winners. The stars for the Manukau side during the season were Tom Butler, Jack Hemi, Jim Murray, George Shilton, Aubrey Thompson, and Puti Tipene Watene. The side was almost entirely composed of Māori players, many of whom had been recruited from around the North Island over the current and preceding seasons. North Shore Albions had a season to forget. Their combined side with Marist in the previous season had finished last in 1942 and in 1943 they came last once again with a 2 win, 1 draw, 12 loss record. They were then knocked out of the Roope Rooster competition in the first round and then lost in the first round of the Phelan Shield 32–0 to City Rovers.

The representative season was short once again due in part to the war. It opened with a match between Auckland Pākehā and Auckland Māori on September 4 which was drawn 13-13. The Māori side was dominated by Manukau players with 8 of the 13 from that club. Auckland played 2 matches against South Auckland who were the northern Waikato side of the time. They lost both matches with sides that could generally be described as under strength. In their first match they were made up of 5 of the 9 club sides with the other 4 playing in the Roope Rooster competition on the same day, then in the return match with South Auckland the champion Manukau side was away and so all of their players were unavailable.

Auckland Rugby League news

Preliminary Meetings
At a conference of all the senior clubs on the evening of March 3 it was agreed that the annual meeting would be held on March 31 with the playing season planned to open on April 10 with a preliminary round. Every club reported that they would be able to put a strong team on the field. Mr. J. Watson, chairman of the board presided over the evening. Mr. A. Chapman was appointed treasurer and Mr. J. Knowling was a member of the Armed Forces. Thomas E. Skinner was the honorary secretary. On March 26 another meeting was held with it confirmed that the season would open on April 10 (with preliminary matches). Chairman, Mr. J.W. Watson said “most senior clubs had discussed the senior grade competition, which would be played on the same lines as last season”. Mr. A Chapman who had recently been appointed treasurer resigned as he had been transferred out of Auckland.

Annual General Meeting
The report for the annual meeting was released prior to the meeting. It stated that one of the matches between the Māori and Pākehā teams in 1942 had seen a record gate for a local game at Carlaw Park. The report noted “that the numerical strength of juniors was not up to former years, although 35 teams competed in a full-time programme. The code appeared to be hit harder by the loss of younger players serving with the fighting forces”. The report also mentioned the “excellent work of the Ladies’ Social Committee. Visits were paid to injured players at home and in hospital. The ladies contributed just over £20 towards the comforts of injured players”. The number of school teams was 32 which “constituted a record”. A total of £3055 was taken at club games at Carlaw Park with £323 paid as grants to clubs on a percentage basis. The injured players’ fund cost £194 6/, £55 was also spent on entertainment during the season. The league also invested in War and Liberty bonds to the amount of £200. The total assets of the Auckland Rugby League stood at £10,743, with Carlaw Park valued at £7,314, and the grandstand at £2,585.

The annual meeting was held at the League Rooms, Greys Building, Courthouse Lane on Wednesday, March 31 at 7.45pm. At the meeting president Mr. G. Grey Campbell said “although there may have been some criticism that football has been carried on during the war, I believe it was a very wise policy to continue … games like football, cricket, hockey, and tennis have been national in this country, and when the players were called upon to fight for their country they had the right moral attitude and courage to fit them for the higher job”, he went on to say “there is no doubt that sport has rendered a particularly fine service to our young men in more ways than one. Regarding those men who will play this season, we know that if an emergency arises they will be the first to go where the trouble is to be found”. Mr. Edward (Ted) John Phelan (a trustee), and chairman Watson congratulated Ivan Culpan who had been secretary of the league for 25 years. Mr. A. Leese, who was on the New Zealand Council said Culpan's “long years of service was a record, and he considered that most of the success of the league was due to his fine work”. Appreciation was also shown towards the treasurer Mr. James Edward Knowling who was now with the armed forces. He was presented with a cheque. The following officers were elected and committees appointed: Chairman, Mr. J.W. Watson; secretary, Mr. Ivan Culpan; treasurer (acting), Mr. R. Doble; club delegates, Messrs. T. Wilson, J. Clark, T. Davis, John William Probert, William Mincham, T. Wilson; insurance, Messrs. R. Doble, T. Davis, E. Chapman; delegate to New Zealand Rugby League, Mr. R. Doble.

Senior competition
Following the first round of preliminary first grade matches on April 10 there was general pleasure in the playing numbers of all eight teams who played. At the board meeting on April 14 chairman J.W. Watson indicated that “in spite of the proposed policy to limit the competition to six teams under the amalgamation scheme, there was now much to be said for the inclusion of nine teams. He added that the Senior Officers’ Association would consider the question at its next meeting”. Following the second round of preliminary games on April 17 it was decided that there was indeed enough strength for a 9 team competition with no need for any clubs to temporarily amalgamate. The 1942 season had seen the forced mergers of Marist Old Boys and North Shore Albions, City Rovers and Otahuhu Rovers, and Newton Rangers and Mount Albert United. The deputy chairman, Mr. Ted Phelan said “the trial games had been very successful, and the prospects for the season looked very bright”. At the meeting it was agreed however that the strength of the senior teams would be reviewed at the end of the first round to determine if the composition of the senior teams would need to change for the remainder of the season. At the June 9 meeting of the board with deputy chairman Mr. John Probert presiding the Senior Officers’ Association suggested that the second round can continue with all nine teams and the management committee agreed.

Player registration rules
At the May 12 board meeting the position of players registrations was discussed. The rule was that if a player did not play for a period of 12 months then they could register with any affiliated club as long as a financial clearance was obtained. And as such any player returning from service who had not played for 12 months should be able to register with any club and not be compelled to register with their previous club. It was decided to refer the issue to the senior clubs for a report.

Resignation of Ernie Asher from City Rovers
In mid May Ernie Asher announced his resignation from the position of secretary for the City Rovers club. It was a position that he had held for an amazing 32 years. Asher had represented New Zealand (6 matches), New Zealand Māori (17 matches), and Auckland (12 matches). He also played 72 games for City from 1910 to 1918 scoring 171 points. At the board meeting the same week chairman Watson said “Mr Asher had given the code outstanding service, both as a player and official”.

Liberty Loan Fund
The proceeds of the matches played at Carlaw Park on June 26 were invested in the Liberty Loan Funds to assist with the war effort. On June 19 Finance Minister, Walter Nash had spoken to the crowd about the fund and the ARL decided to contribute during the following week. Then at their board meeting on June 30 they decided to invest £200 more in addition to the £400 they had already invested. The Referees’ Association and the schoolboys executive had increased the donation by £10 each.

Auckland representative side
At the April 23 board meeting Dougie McGregor, Bill Cloke, and Jack Kirwan were appointed the Auckland representative selectors for the season. The Wellington Rugby League requested a representative game in Wellington. Mr. Phelan thought that “every encouragement should be given to the playing of representative games, and it was decided to arrange a suitable date for the match. Ultimately there were no representative matches played with Wellington, though the City Rovers did visit on their bye weekend to play a Wellington Māori side at Newtown Park in Wellington.

Injured players fund
At the board meeting on May 12 the issue of assistance to the injured players fund was discussed. The senior officers’ association wrote a letter to the board asking that the ‘players day’ matches be played on the weekend between the championship final and the Roope Rooster competition. At the league meeting on June 2 the ladies’ social committee forwarded a donation of £5 toward the injured players fund. Chairman Watson remarked “that the ladies had done splendid service in this respect”.

Carlaw Park
Prior to the commencement of the season if was proposed that charges for soldiers in uniform would increase. Mr. T. Davis said that last season all men in uniform were admitted at half price. It was decided at the meeting that uniformed men, other than returned soldiers should pay the usual admission price. The price for admission for the season was set at 1 shilling for the ground, with ladies at 6 pence, and admission into the railway stand a further 6 pence. On May 5 several clubs appealed for the easing of restrictions on the use of the flood lights at Carlaw Park so they could train in the evenings. The matter was referred to the electric lighting controller. Chairman Watson said that the ground still came within the restricted area which banned lighting at night time due to the war and the threat of night time bombing. The St John Ambulance Brigade requested the provision of additional first aid rooms at Carlaw Park at the June 2 meeting of the league. The request was granted. In July all servicemen who were home on furlough who wore the New Zealand shoulder strap were admitted to games for free.

Shortage of jerseys
At the April 14 ARL meeting it was reported that clubs were having trouble securing football jerseys and other equipment. The Rationing Controller, Mr. J.E. Thomas said that “individual football clubs must make early application to the local rationing office, and arrangements would then be made to provide gear. The letter pointed out, however, that with the coupon issue, the requirements should be kept down as much as possible”. Chairman Watson also appealed to all clubs to follow the advice of the controller strictly.

Donation to Lance Todd Memorial
On May 5 it was decided that the league would donate 3 guineas to the proposed Lance B. Todd memorial which the English Rugby League were sponsoring. Todd had been killed in a car accident in England in late 1942 on his way home from duty in Oldham. Todd had played rugby in Auckland before switching codes and joining the New Zealand team for the 1907–1908 tour of Great Britain and Australia. He later settled in England and played for Wigan and Dewsbury. After his playing retirement Todd coached Salford to several championship titles and then in 1933 became the commentator for BBC Radio. The man of the match in the Challenge Cup final is still presented with the Lance Todd Trophy.

Obituaries
A number of Auckland rugby league players were killed during 1943. Jack Frederick Crang Taplin and Lyndsay Dennis Evans were two who were involved with senior grade sides.

John (Jack) Frederick Crang Taplin
John (Jack) Frederick Crang Taplin was killed in action on July 22, 1942, aged just 27. He was educated at Marist Brothers’ School and was the manager of the Richmond Rovers side prior to going to war. His father was John Taplin, and mother Mildred Taplin. John (Jack) was living in Onehunga at the time of his enlistment. He was killed in the Western Desert campaign, North Africa and buried at El Alamein War Cemetery, Egypt. Taplin's two brothers, Edgar, and Albert were also serving in the war at the time. Jack is memorialised at the Onehunga War Memorial Swimming Pool, and at the Auckland War Memorial Museum, World War 2 Hall of Memories.

Lyndsay Dennis Evans
Lyndsay Dennis Evans was killed in action on April 20, 1943, after previously having been reported missing. Nicknamed ‘Bun’ he was the youngest son of Mrs. Catherine Evans and the late Mr. Alfred Evans, of 51 Wallace Road, Papakura. He had been educated at Papakura School and Pukekohe High School. Evans represented the South Auckland Primary School's representative side in the Northern Roller Mills Shield Competition in 1931. After leaving high school he worked as an attendant at the Kingseat Mental Hospital. He played rugby league for the Papakura club and in 1938 scored 6 tries so the senior side. He had left New Zealand in December 1942 with the Second New Zealand Expeditionary Force and was a Private in the 21 Infantry Battalion. Evans was killed in action after being shot in the chest and stomach by German artillery at Takrouna, Tunisia aged 25. He was buried at Enfidaville War Cemetery, Tunisia. He is memorialised at the Karaka War Memorial, on Great South Road, Papakura and in the Auckland War Memorial Museum, World War 2 Hall of Memories.

Ernest Charles Bailey
Former North Shore Albions player, Ernest (Ernie) Charles Bailey was killed in an accident at the shipyards of Charles Bailey and Son, Limited on December 8. Bailey had been a well known boat builder his entire life. He played originally for North Shore rugby club in the 1900s but joined the fledgling league code around 1911 when in his mid 20s. He played in the front row for North Shore Albions throughout the 1910s scoring 8 tries, and played 2 games for Auckland in 1919 when he was aged 36. The first was against the New Zealand side on May 24, which was preparing to depart for their tour of Australia. He played the New Zealand side again on their return from Australia on August 23. Bailey was aged 60 at the time of his death and was survived by a wife and three sons. A fourth son had been killed while serving with the Royal New Zealand Navy.

Fox Memorial Shield (senior grade championship)

Preliminary rounds
As in previous seasons there were two preliminary rounds of games played to ascertain the strength of the various clubs at the senior level before the size of the Fox Memorial competition would be determined. With there being no reserve grade or senior B competition the numbers for the main grade were surprisingly high with “no shortage of players” and it was decided to allow all 9 clubs to compete without mergers as there had been the previous season. Otahuhu Rovers surprised Richmond Rovers with a 13–7 win.

Round 1

Round 2
New Zealand international Arthur McInnarney made a reappearance for Mount Albert after a year out of the game, while Bert Leatherbarrow kicked 4 conversions in their 20–13 win over Marist. Arthur Kay turned out once more for Ponsonby and was now in his 11th season in their senior side. He scored a try and kicked 7 goals in Ponsonby's 29–25 win over Newton. By the end of the season he had accumulated 496 career points for Ponsonby in all matches. For Newton, Ivan Gregory scored a hat trick. Puti Tipene Watene turned out for Newton but re-joined Manukau later in the season. Tommy Chase kicked 4 goals in Manukau's 26–23 win over Otahuhu. Following this round of matches there were no official games the following weekend though some practice matches were played before the first round of the Fox Memorial kicked off on May 1.

Fox Memorial standings
{|
|-
|

Fox Memorial results

Round 1
Former New Zealand representatives Wally Tittleton and Cliff Satherley both reappeared for Richmond in their 16–12 loss to Newton. Satherley would die in tragic circumstances less than 3 years later after disappearing from Wellington Public Hospital in January 1947 with his body found on Lyall Bay Beach 3 days later.  He had had an extraordinary rugby and rugby league career as a player, and he coached the Mount Albert senior side in 1937. The Auckland Star reported that the only Pākehā in the Manukau side was the 15st forward, Seymour who had joined the side from Papakura. The rest of the side were all Māori. Hawea Mataira was in his seventh season for City Rovers and scored a try in their win over Ponsonby. Pouvi Salaia played for City and scored a try. He was one of the first ever Pacific Island players to play rugby league in Auckland. Kiwi's Alf Mitchell and brother George Mitchell, along with Dave Solomon being a handful of others who had been born in the Pacific Islands. Salaia died in 1950 aged just 32 and was buried in Papakura Cemetery.

Round 2
Otahuhu played their first match as a stand-alone club in the first grade since 1919 when they withdrew after just one match. In 1931 they were part of a combined Ellerslie-Otahuhu side in the first grade, finishing last out of 7 teams, and then in 1941 they were part of a combined City-Otahuhu side which finished runner up. They scored a surprise 19–18 win over Newton in the main game on Carlaw Park. Puti Tipene Watene turned out for Manukau as they were short in the forwards. There were two players injured by sprigs and “it was decided to make an inspection of all boots at frequent intervals during the season”. Jack Donovan refereed his 50th match between first grade sides in the City v North Shore match.

Round 3
Pita Ririnui and Joe Cootes both turned out for Manukau. Ririnui reportedly weighed 17st while Cootes weighed 14st 8lbs. They proved too heavy for Otahuhu in the scrums as they won an even match 10–7. Cootes was a Wellington representative though had played in Auckland on occasion before. Bert Leatherbarrow scored a try and kicked 3 conversions in Mt Albert's 15–2 win over North Shore.

Round 4
North Shore scored their 5,000 point in the 1st grade championship. They were the 3rd team to do it after Ponsonby and City. Their game was stopped at the 31st minute of the second half because it had kicked off late and the Marist – North Shore game was scheduled to kick off at 3:00pm and it was already 3:10pm when fulltime was blown early.

Round 5
Otahuhu Rovers captain Kenneth Finlayson scored a try in their 19–15 loss to Mount Albert. His father was Charles Finlayson who played cricket for New Zealand in 1928 against Australia, and rugby league for New Zealand in 1913 against New South Wales. Warwick Clarke played for City and kicked a conversion. He had been playing in Wellington the season prior. He would go on to play 11 tests for New Zealand.

Round 6
Robert Grotte appeared for City for the first time in the season.

Round 7
In the main match between City and Manukau which Manukau won 13–8, City suffered an injury to Hughes in the first half. He was replaced by Dufty who then limped for “most of the game”, and then Robert Salaia, their centre-three-quarter left the field with 20 minutes remaining with an injury leaving them a man short. The win pushed Manukau ahead of City in the race for the Rukutai Shield, awarded to the team in the lead at the end of the first round. The Otahuhu captain on the day, N Johnson was ordered off based on a line umpire's report in their 21–8 loss to Marist.

Round 8
Sir Walter Nash attended the matches at Carlaw Park and spoke to the crowd about the Liberty Loan proposal. At the time he was the Minister of Finance and he would go on to become the 27th Prime Minister of New Zealand in 1957. In the main match between Manukau and Mt Albert Jack Hemi made his first appearance of the season for Manukau and kicked 3 goals in their 26–12 win. Basil Cranch added to his points tally with 3 goals. His younger brother Ray, who would debut a few seasons later had the senior B trophy named after him in 2020. For Manukau, William Henry Inglis also played and he would be tragically killed months after arriving to serve in World War 2. He was aged just 21 at the time of his death and was buried at the Cassino War Cemetery in Italy.

Round 9
In the match between City and Marist, J Costello scored 3 tries, the last of which needed a conversion by Lindsay Simons on fulltime but he missed and City hung on for a 12–11 win. It was decided by the league to donate the proceeds from the day to the Liberty Loan which Walter Nash had spoken about the previous Saturday. Manukau won the Rukutai Shield with a 7 win, 1 loss record through the first round.

Round 10
Manukau scored their 2,000th point in the first grade championship during their easy 32–10 win over North Shore. They had fielded teams in the 1912 and 1913 seasons but struggled, scoring just 3 wins and a draw from 15 games. They withdrew after just 5 games of the 1913 season. After re-joining the first grade competition in 1936 they had forged a remarkable record since then. Over the 1936 to 1942 period they had a record of 66-6-33 record, scoring 1,779 points in that time and by the end of this 1943 season had added another 14 wins to go with their 2 losses. Former Auckland wicket keeper, and North Shore captain Horace Hunt scored a try for North Shore. Coincidentally he had replaced Verdun Scott 2 seasons prior as captain after he went away to war. Scott himself was also the Auckland cricket wicket keeper and would return from war and become the only New Zealand rugby league representative to also play test cricket for New Zealand.

Round 11
Carlaw Park was described as a quagmire for the round 11 matches. As a result, Jack Hemi employed a kicking game for his backs to chase. Flags flew at half-mast at Carlaw Park after the death of former New Zealand international Charles Finlayson.

Round 12
With Richmond's 36–5 win over City they brought up their 4,000th point in first grade championship matches. They became the 5th team to achieve this behind Ponsonby, City, North Shore, and Newton.

Round 13
Tommy Chase returned to the Manukau side after recovering from an injury earlier in the season. Jim Murray was ordered off for Manukau in their 11–5 win over Newton and was severely cautioned by the league.

Round 14
In the main match City led Manukau 7–0 at halftime before conceding 18 unanswered points to lose 18–7. The result all but sealed the championship for Manukau. Arthur Kay came back from injury for Ponsonby, while Roy Nurse also turned out for them.

Round 15
Ponsonby played their 400th match in the first grade championship stretching back to 1910 when it started. It is highly unlikely that the club was aware of this fact as record keeping in the early decades was haphazard. North Shore played Richmond at the Devonport Domain. This was the only first grade match in the season played away from Carlaw Park. The 4th match at Carlaw Park was between Auckland Juniors and South Auckland Juniors.

Round 16
Manukau officially sealed the championship with Richmond's loss to Marist, being 6 points clear with just 2 rounds remaining. Following from Ponsonby achieving the feat, City played in their 400th match in the first grade championship.

Round 17
In the Marist match with Manukau, Bill Glover kicked at the rolling ball and it went over the crossbar with the referee awarding a drop goal. Newton played their 400th game in first grade championship history, weeks behind Ponsonby and City. North Shore finished last for the 4th time in their history, the other occasions being 1910, 1918, and 1942.

Round 18
Only two matches were played in the final round to find the runner up in the Fox Memorial competition. The reason being that in the event of champions Manukau also winning the Roope Rooster competition then the runners up would play them for the Stormont Shield. Manukau did indeed go on to win the Roope Rooster and as a result they played City, who beat Marist and hung on to second position, 1 win ahead of Richmond, who also had a 10–5 win over Manukau. The two matches were part of the inaugural ‘Chairman’s Day’ where the chairman of the league had the opportunity to choose which teams would meet. Mr. J.W. Watson wrote “it is the chairman’s privilege on this day to put on any game in any way he thinks fit. It gives him the opportunity of extending hospitality to friends and particularly to supporters and officials of kindred sports. We hope to have a particularly good game this year. The match is between Manukau and Richmond, two teams which can be depeneded upon to provide a good, fast, open game of football”. Mr. Joseph Patrick Moodabe donated a trophy for the match between Richmond and Manukau. The day proved a success with the largest crowd of the “largest attendance of the season at Carlaw Park” with 15,000 present.

Roope Rooster

Round 1
The Roope Rooster knockout competition began with Newton and North Shore playing a solitary match in round 1. North Shore lost and were the first side eliminated.

Round 2

Semi finals
Ponsonby continued their late season improved form. Brian Riley had returned to the side the week prior and against Richmond he ran in 4 tries. This was his 11th season for Ponsonby and he had now scored 60 tries for them over that time. Norman Shalfoon scored a try for Manukau. He had been a representative rugby player in the Bay of Plenty.

Roope Rooster final

Phelan Shield

Semi finals

Semi final
The semi final between Mt Albert and City received no newspaper coverage at all. Mt Albert won the match however as they advanced to the final to play Otahuhu.

Phelan Shield final

Stormont Shield final
The Stormont Shield final was played in heavy rain, with Manukau coming out on top 12–9 to win the Stormont Shield for the 3rd consecutive season. The score had been 0–0 at halftime before Manukau scored 7 points. City responded with 3 tries to take a 9–7 lead before a Manukau backline break with 4 minutes to go saw Tumata pass to Jack Hemi who cut past Robert Salaia and then “beat Warwick Clarke badly to score the winning try”.

Top try scorers and point scorers
The try and point scoring lists were compiled from Fox Memorial, Roope Rooster, Phelan Shield, and Stormont Shield matches. Ron McGregor was in his second season for Richmond and led all try scorers with 14. Jim Murray, the prolific try scorer for Manukau was 2 tries behind him, while a number of players finished the season with 8 or 9. Basil Cranch (Mt Albert) finished with the most points, with 90. He was one ahead of Alan Donovan (City) who had also finished 2nd in 1942. Jack Hemi scored 49 points but had joined Manukau midway through the season. He now had over 700 points for Manukau in all games through 8 seasons.

Other club matches

Wellington Māori v City
In August, when City had a bye they travelled to Wellington to play the Wellington Māori side. They were almost entirely made up of the Aotea Club team with the exception of 3 players. The locals proved too strong, winning 31–13 at Newtown Park before a “large crowd”.  City were captained by Puti Tipene Watene as a guest player as he was playing with Manukau at the time. Hawea Mataira also made the trip.

Manukau v Blackball (West Coast)
On October 16 Blackball, the West Coast champions came to Auckland to play the Auckland champions, Manukau. Blackball had beaten the Christchurch champions, Sydenham by 43 points to 6, and then the Wellington champions, Petone, by 34 points to 7. Jack Amos, the South Island selector had said that they were the best club side that he had ever seen. They were coached by former New Zealand player, Johnny Dodds and captained by Ces Mountford who would later play for Wigan for many years and coach the New Zealand side. The game was played before an enormous crowd of 17,000 and was close for 60 minutes with Blackball leading 9-5 before the heavier Manukau forward pack wore them down and scored several late tries.

Lower grades
The junior control board advised in October that the J.F.W. Dickson Medal, presented for the best behaved player was won by M. Ryan of the Pt Chevalier club, and the trophy for the runner up was awarded to A. Dracevich of Glenora. Pt Chevalier won the Davis Points Shield and the Tracy Inglis Shield for scoring the most championship points in all grades. They had a particularly successful season, winning the 3rd, 5th, and 7th grades, and also winning the 7th grade knockout competition. The 3rd grade side won the championship beating City in the final after both sides had a 14–2 record. The New Zealand Herald and Auckland Star devoted almost no coverage whatsoever to any grade below the senior competition and as a result it is unknown how many teams played in any of the lower grades and from what clubs. On September 30 however the Auckland Star did report that in addition to Point Chevalier's grade wins, Richmond Rovers won the fourth grade, and Mt Albert won the sixth grade.
Despite no coverage of lower grade competitions the Ellerslie United club advertised the opponents and venue of their lower grade sides throughout the season and so the following lists of teams in those particular grades have been compiled.

Senior B
Ellerslie and Green Lane. Ellerslie seemingly withdrew from this grade early in the season.

Third grade
City, Ellerslie, Glenora, Green Lane, Manukau, Mt Albert, Point Chevalier, Otahuhu, Ponsonby.

Fourth grade
Avondale, Ellerslie, Newton, North Shore, Northcote, Point Chevalier, Otahuhu, Papakura, Ponsonby, and Richmond.

Fifth grade
Avondale, Ellerslie, Green Lane, Newton, Mount Albert, Point Chevalier

Schoolboys
In a match at Grey Lynn Park, Alexander Edmund Kirkland fractured his left shoulder while playing for Otahuhu.

Intermediate
Ellerslie, Green Lane, Marist, Mount Albert, Otahuhu, Papakura, Ponsonby, Richmond

Juniors
Ellerslie, Glenora, Green Lane, Marist, Mount Albert, Point Chevalier

Representative season
Auckland only played 2 matches and on each occasion was below strength. For the first match against South Auckland in Huntly they were made up of players from 5 of the 9 clubs, while in the return match they were missing players from the champion Manukau side who had travelled to Taihape to play the Taihape Māori rugby side. They were selected by Bill Cloke, Dougie McGregor, and Jack Kirwan.

Representative matches

Auckland Pākehā v Auckland Māori
Jack Hemi went off injured before halftime for the Māori side.

South Auckland v Auckland
The Auckland side which travelled to Huntly was only made up of players from the city, Marist, Newton, North Shore and Otahuhu sides. The other four teams were all playing in the semi finals of the Roope Rooster. Horace Hunt from the North Shore club played for Auckland. He had previously represented Auckland at cricket in the summer of 1929/30 in 4 Plunket Shield matches. Interestingly he had taken over the captaincy of North Shore in 1941 when Verdun Scott went away to war, himself a wicket keeper for New Zealand as well as a New Zealand rugby league representative.

Auckland v South Auckland
Cloke, McGregor, and Kirwan selected future New Zealand representative Warwick Clarke to play at fullback. McGregor's nephew Ron McGregor was chosen in the three quarters after an outstanding season for Richmond and would later go on to represent New Zealand. Experienced Ponsonby players Brian Riley and Arthur Kay were selected in the five eighths positions while Hawea Mataira was chosen in the forwards. The South Auckland side however ran out easy 21-9 winners after a "high-class exhibition of the code to a large crowd". Their passing movements were particularly impressive.

Auckland matches played and scorers

Auckland Pākehā matches played and scorers

Auckland Māori (Tāmaki) matches played and scorers

Junior matches

Annual General Meetings and Club News

ARL Junior Control Board
They held their annual meeting in the League Rooms, Courthouse Lane on Tuesday, March 30 at 8pm. The junior control board advised in mid April that the following officers were elected:- chairman, Mr. E. Chapman; deputy-chairman, Mr. C. Howe; secretary, Mr. W.F. Clarke; assistant secretary and grounds allocator, Mr. G. Stonex. The board expressed their frustration at their meeting in mid May that clubs were granting transfers to junior players without the consent of the board. Chairman Mr. E. Chapman “cited several cases of flagrant defiance of the conditions” and “complaints were referred to the clubs concerned”.

ARL Primary School Management Committee

ARL Referees Association
The held their Annual Meeting in the A.R.L Board Rooms in Grey's Buildings on Monday, March 8 at 8pm. Their honorary secretary was Thomas E. Skinner.

Avondale League Football Club
Avondale held their annual meeting on Tuesday, April 6 at 8pm in the Labour Party's Room at St. George's Road in Avondale. All coaches and intending players were asked to attend. Their honorary secretary was H.W. Green. On July 9 the Avondale club published a memorial for Norm York, their clubmate who had passed away on July 8, 1940.

City Rovers
City Rovers held a practice at Carlaw Park on Saturday in early April at 2:30 and on each Tuesday and Thursday evening thereafter from 5 to 7pm. Their secretary was Ernie Asher. At the June 2 meeting of the ARL a request was made by the City Rovers club to play a game in Wellington in the second round of the competition when they had a bye. A decision was deferred. At the June 9 meeting they were granted permission to play a match in Wellington when they had their bye.

Ellerslie United League Football Club
Ellerslie held their annual general meeting at the Parish Hall in Ellerslie on March 22 at 8pm. Their honorary secretary was Mr. G. Whaley. They held a practice for all grades at Ellerslie School Ground on Saturday, April 3 at 2.30pm. A further practice was advertised for Saturday, April 17 at Ellerslie Reserve at 2.30pm for all grades with instructions for all players to meet at the League Rooms the night before to weigh in.

Green Lane Rugby League Club
Green Lane held their annual meeting in the Old Fire Station on Green Lane Road, on Monday, April 5 at 8pm. Their honorary secretary was W. Cheesman.

Glenora Rugby League Football Club
Glenora lost two of their best junior players to Mt Albert at the start of the season, G.E. Balcombe (forward) and A. Jones (second five).

Manukau Rugby League Football Club
on October 9 the Manukau side travelled to Taihape to play the Taihape Māori side. The local team was composed of rugby players and after the match the rugby union banned them from the game for playing a rugby league match.

Marist Brothers Old Boys League Football Club
MaristOld Boys held their annual meeting at the rugby league rooms on Courthouse Lane on Thursday, 25 March at 7.45pm. Jack Kirwan was their honorary secretary. They held a meeting at the Courthouse Lane ARL Rooms on Friday, March 26 for all junior and schoolboy players. Lance Corporal Charles Henry Patrick Malone died on March 24, 1943, from his wounds. He was the only son of Mr. Charles Daniel Malone, and Mrs. Lilian Evelyn Malone who lived on New North Road in Kingsland. He was 26 years of age and had been educated at Marist Brothers’ School and the Seddon Memorial Technical College. He played rugby league for the Marist club and was also noted as a “keen sportsman”. He left New Zealand with the First Echalon and was part of the 24 Infantry Battalion. Malone was taken prisoner at Bardia while he was attending to wounded soldiers. He was later rescued by the British, but was wounded during action on Ruwersat Ridge. He recovered but after being posted with his unit again was wounded once more on an allied push in Tunisia, North Africa. He was buried at Sfax War Cemetery, Tunisia. He is memorialised at the Auckland War Memorial Museum, in the World War 2 Hall of Memories.

Mt. Albert United Rugby League Football Club
Mt Albert held their Annual General Meeting at their club headquarters at Fowld's Park in Morningside on Monday, March 15. Their honorary secretary was F.W. Clements. They advertised a practice at Fowlds Park in Morningside for Saturday, March 20 at 2pm. Their honorary secretary was F.W. Clements. On August 28 Mt Albert held a “Welcome Home Dance” for their “returned boys on furlough from the Middle East” at 8pm at the St George's Hall in Kingsland. And advertisement was placed by Mrs. H. Wood, the secretary of the Ladies Social Committee.

Newton Rangers Football Club
Newton Rangers held their annual meeting on March 22 with Mr. M.J. Hooper presiding. The following officers were elected:- Patron, Mr. Hooper; patroness, Mrs. J.A. Lee; vice patron, Mr. A. Blakey; president, Hon. W.E. Parry; hon. secretary, Mr. W. Treston; club captain, J. Ginders; schools’ board delegate, Mr. M. McKay; coach, Mr. Roy Hardgrave; committee, Messrs. Dyer, Dunn, B. Zimmerman, Hardgrave, Moyle, Fred Zimmerman, Everitt, and Laurensen. They held practises at Carlaw Park on Saturday, March 27, at 2pm for all grades. Their honorary secretary was Mr. J.A. Mackinnon.

North Shore Albions
Henry Raymond ‘Harry’ Zane-Zaninovich was killed in action in the Western Desert, Middle East on January 17, 1943. He played senior league for North Shore and also Manukau. He was 23 years of age. North Shore Albions held their annual meeting in their football shed on Vauxhill Road on Monday, March 29 at 8pm. Their honorary secretary was M.W. Coghlan.  Former North Shore player John Fraser King was killed in action in Tunisia on March 26, 1943. He was married to Dorothy Beatrice King and living on Tahatai Street in Otahuhu at the time of his departure for war. He was the second son of Mr. John Brownlow King and Mrs. Isobel Blackeston King of Devonport. King had left for the war with the Third Echelon and was part of the 24 Infantry Battalion. He had previously served in World War I and was a sergeant in WW2. King was buried at the Sfax War Cemetery, Tunisia. He is memorialised on Devonport Memorial Drive, Auckland, and at the Auckland War Memorial Museum in the World War 2 Hall of Memories.

On Saturday, August 7 Jack Campbell, the former New Zealand representative and North Shore player was wed to Wilma Stirling. Campbell was home from the war on furlough. Stirling was the sister of Ivor Stirling, another New Zealand league representative, while she was a junior high school swimming champion at Whangarei High School, while her sister, Dulcie, was a New Zealand Hockey representative. Their niece, Glenda Stirling would go on to represent New Zealand at swimming in the 1968 Olympic Games and their nephew Ken Stirling also represented New Zealand at rugby league.

Northcote and Birkenhead Ramblers Football Club

Otahuhu Rugby League Football Club

Papakura Rugby League Football Club
In late May Mr. S. Heron, who was secretary of the Papakura Amateur Athletic Club and speaking on behalf of the Papakura Rugby League Club asked the Papakura Borough Council if they would receive a “deputation of both clubs for the purpose of discussing matters relative to Prince Edward Park. The council agreed to receive the deputation. In late June the Amateur Athletic Club and Papakura Rugby League Club sent a delegation to the Papakura Borough Council meeting to request a lease of Prince Edward Park of 5 years. There were “various speakers [who] pointed out that they had considerable money available to spend on buildings and laying out work, but required some security of tenure before spending any money on many needed improvements that were necessary for the successful running of the sports of the two clubs”. Mayor Mr. S Evans spoke on the fairness to ratepayers of having two clubs having full power over the park and that the council should be represented on the committee of control. The deputation was then promised that the matter would come before the Domain Board for discussion before any decisions were reached. On August 7 Len Cooke broke his jaw in a match after receiving a kick in the face. He was taken to Auckland Hospital for treatment before returning home. It was said that he was one of the clubs best players and had kicked many goals for his side.

Point Chevalier League Football Club
Point Chevalier held practice for all grades at Walker Park on Saturday, April 3 at 2pm. Their honorary secretary was Mr. A.G. Daniels. In August the honorary secretary, A. G. Daniels thanked those who donated at the benefit dance for the club.

Ponsonby United Football Club
 Gunner, Walter Goodwin was killed in action on June 18, 1942, however his death was not reported in the newspapers until January 1943. He was a prominent member of the Ponsonby club and played for the senior side in the early 1930s including the side which won the championship in 1930. Ponsonby held a committee meeting on Monday, March 1 and their Annual Meeting on Monday, March 8 at 7pm at the Leys Institute. Ponsonby held practises for all grades at Carlaw Park on Tuesday's and Thursday's at 5pm and also on Saturday afternoons prior to the commencement of the season. On April 7 Ponsonby made an application to play a game against a South Auckland (upper Waikato) club on Easter Saturday. However a decision was deferred as it was not known if club matches would be taking place on that date. In September former player Flight Sergeant William Henry John (Bill) Bowsher was reported missing on operations in the war. He was educated at Auckland Grammar School and left New Zealand for Canada in January 1941 where he trained at the RCAF, 3 Wireless School in Winnipeg, Manitoba, and then at the RCAF, 6 Bombing and Gunnery School, Mountain View, Ontario. It was later confirmed that he had been killed in action during air operations in the Mediterranean on August 5, 1943. He was survived by his parents, Henry Thomas Bowsher, and Nora Bowsher. He was memorialised at the Malta Memorial in Malta, the Auckland War Memorial Museum in the World War 2 Hall of Memories, and Auckland Grammar School War Memorial.

Richmond Rovers Football Club
Richmond held their annual meeting at the club rooms at Grey Lynn Park on Wednesday, March 10 at 8pm. Their honorary secretary was W.R. Dick. Richmond held practice for all grades at Grey Lynn Park on Saturday, April 3 for all grades. The schoolboys at 1.30pm, juniors at 2pm, and seniors at 3pm. Their honorary secretary was W.R. Dick.

References

External links
 Auckland Rugby League Official Site

Auckland Rugby League seasons
Rugby league in Auckland
Rugby league governing bodies in New Zealand
Rugby league